The Mu Kuang English School is a secondary school on Kung Lok Road, Kwun Tong, Kowloon, Hong Kong. It is a non-government school funded under the Direct Subsidy Scheme.

History
The school was founded by Elsie Elliott in Kai Tak New Village in 1954 with an enrolment of 30 squatter and refugee children. Classes were held under makeshift canopies, and Elliott supported the school financially by teaching in other schools. Andrew Tu Hsueh-kwei, whom Elliott married in 1985, became headmaster of the school. The school accommodation was doubled in size in 1958 thanks to a donation from Mr. N.V.A. Croucher.

"Mu Kuang" means "yearning for light" in Chinese. The school was so named in reference to a "thirsting for the light of learning and truth". Elliott later quipped that the name came to refer to a literal thirst for daylight, since it was so dark inside the former British Army tent in which classes were initially held.

Owing to the "extreme poverty and suffering" in the area, the school staff tried to undertake relief work near the school. A simple clinic was set up at the school for emergency treatment. A formal social welfare clinic, offering medical services and distribution of relief food, was set up at the school with the assistance of members of the Guild of Saint Helena in 1959.

About five years after its founding, the school moved to occupy two storeys of a building on Nga Tsin Wai Road. It later expanded with two branches, on Lion Rock Road and Prince Edward Road respectively. The school took out an interest-free government loan of $2 million and raised an additional $600,000 to build a permanent school building.

On 28 November 1972, the new  school building was opened on Kung Lok Road, Kwun Tong by the Director of Education, J. Canning. It was built to accommodate 1,400 pupils. The building was designed by architect P.K. Chan and built by the Hoover Construction Company. A new building wing was added in 1986 directly to the north of the older one.

Description
Mu Kuang English School is a co-ed institution with media of instruction of English and Chinese. As of 2015, the school had a staff of 72 teachers.

Notable alumni
 Osman Hung – actor and singer-songwriter
 Miriam Yeung – actress and singer

See also
 Garden Estate
 Lok Wah Estate
 Upper Ngau Tau Kok Estate

References

External links

 

1954 establishments in Hong Kong
Kwun Tong
Secondary schools in Hong Kong